Franz Xaver Pecháček (4 July 1793 in Vienna – 15 September 1840 in Karlsruhe) was an Austrian-German violin virtuoso and composer of Bohemian origin. Besides polonaises, variations, Rondos and potpourris for violin and orchestra, he composed two string quartets and the Adagio et Polonaise for clarinet and orchestra.

Biography
Franz Pecháček was a very gifted student and already at a very early age performed as a soloist. He was trained by his father František Martin Pecháček and by Ignaz Schuppanzigh and Emanuel Aloys Förster. When he was six he performed before the imperial court and in 1803 he went publicly with his father for the first time to Prague, where he was received with great success, thus gaining his reputation as a child prodigy. Other musical education he acquired in Vienna, where he studied composition with Förster.

From 1809 to 1822 he was a violinist at the Theater an der Wien, first as a concertmaster and later as a second conductor. In 1818 he was appointed first violinist of the Hanoverian court orchestra. Guest performance tours took him further to Dresden and Leipzig, and from 1824 to 1825 the cities of southern Germany. He also became concertmaster of the court orchestra in Stuttgart from 1822 until 1826, being appointed as concertmaster of the Grand Duke of Baden Karlsruhe court orchestra in 1827, where he worked until 15 September 1840. In 1832 he made a trip to Paris, but there the expected success did not come. Parisians saw in his play an imitation of Niccolo Paganini and, as a result of his strenuous concerts, he was only a disappointment.

As a violinist and composer Pecháček was very esteemed, writing works almost exclusively for solo violin with accompaniment. As a virtuoso, however, he never defined himself as such. He composed about 40 works. These are short pieces for violin and orchestra, dances and variations.

Works
Deuxie (1822)
Grand Quatuor for two Violins, Viola and Violoncello, Op. 4 (1818)
Quatuor brillant for two Violins, Viola and Violoncello, Op. 7
Variations on Schubert's German Dance D365 No. 2 Trauerwalzer, Op. 9
Adagio et Polonaise for Piano four-hands, Op. 14
First concertino for Violin with accompaniment of Orchestra, Op. 16 (1826)
Variations sur un theme hongrois for Violin with Orchestra or two Violins, Viola and Violoncello, Op. 17 (1834)
Polonaise for Violin with Orchestra accompaniment, Op. 18 (1826)
Divertissement for Solo Violin with accompaniment of Orchestra or two Violins, Viola and Violoncello, Op. 20 (1826)
Introduction and Brilliant Variations on a Favorite Air for Violin with accompaniment for Pianoforte, Op. 28 (1845)

See also
List of composers by name

References

Attribution
This article is based on the translation of the corresponding article on the German Wikipedia. A list of contributors can be found there at the History section.

External links

1793 births
1840 deaths
Austrian violinists
Male violinists
Austrian Romantic composers
Musicians from Vienna
19th-century classical composers
Austrian male classical composers
19th-century male musicians